Parabrimus is a genus of longhorn beetles of the subfamily Lamiinae, containing the following species:

 Parabrimus alboscutellatus Breuning, 1936
 Parabrimus bimaculatus Breuning, 1981
 Parabrimus ruficornis Breuning, 1981

References

Phrissomini